This is a list of singles that have peaked in the Top 10 of the Billboard Hot 100 during 1981.

Hall & Oates scored four top ten hits during the year with "Kiss on My List", "You Make My Dreams", "Private Eyes", and "I Can't Go for That (No Can Do)", the most among all other artists.

Top-ten singles

1980 peaks

1982 peaks

See also
 1981 in music
 List of Hot 100 number-one singles of 1981 (U.S.)
 Billboard Year-End Hot 100 singles of 1981

References

General sources

Joel Whitburn Presents the Billboard Hot 100 Charts: The Eighties
Additional information obtained can be verified within Billboard's online archive services and print editions of the magazine.

1981
United States Hot 100 Top 10